Julia Simon may refer to:

Julia Simon (sport shooter) (born 1991), German sport shooter
Julia Simon (biathlete) (born 1996), French biathlete